The 45th World Science Fiction Convention (Worldcon), also known as Conspiracy '87, was held on 27 August–1 September 1987 at the Metropole Hotel and The Brighton Centre in Brighton, United Kingdom.

The initial chairman was Malcolm Edwards, who had to scale back his involvement several months before the con, and was succeeded by Paul Oldroyd with the title of "coordinator", later recognised as chairman.

Participants 

Attendance was 4,009, out of 5,425 paid memberships.

Guests of Honour 

 Doris Lessing (UK)
 Alfred Bester (US) (did not attend, due to poor health)
 Arkady Strugatsky and Boris Strugatsky (USSR)
 Jim Burns (artist)
 Ray Harryhausen (film)
 Joyce Slater & Ken Slater (fan)
 David Langford (special fan)
 Brian W. Aldiss (toastmaster)

Awards

1987 Hugo Awards 

 Best Novel: Speaker for the Dead by Orson Scott Card
 Best Novella: "Gilgamesh in the Outback" by Robert Silverberg
 Best Novelette: "Permafrost" by Roger Zelazny
 Best Short Story: "Tangents" by Greg Bear
 Best Non-Fiction Book: Trillion Year Spree by Brian Aldiss with David Wingrove
 Best Dramatic Presentation: Aliens
 Best Semiprozine: Locus, edited by Charles N. Brown
 Best Professional Editor: Terry Carr
 Best Professional Artist: Jim Burns
 Best Fanzine: Ansible, edited by Dave Langford
 Best Fan Writer: Dave Langford
 Best Fan Artist: Brad Foster

Other awards 

 John W. Campbell Award for Best New Writer: Karen Joy Fowler

See also 

 Hugo Award
 Science fiction
 Speculative fiction
 World Science Fiction Society
 Worldcon

References

External links 

 NESFA.org: The Long List
 NESFA.org: 1987 convention notes 

1987 conferences
1987 in England
Science fiction conventions in Europe
Science fiction conventions in the United Kingdom
Worldcon